The Bođani Monastery is a Serbian Orthodox monastery in the Bačka region, in the northern Serbian province of Vojvodina. The monastery is near the village of Bođani, in the Bač municipality. Among the few Serbian Orthodox monasteries in the Bačka, Bođani is the oldest.

History 

The monastery was founded in 1478. According to myth, Bogdan, a merchant from Dalmatia, was travelling in the area when he got blind. In the vicinity of the Danube he stopped, washed his eyes at the nearby spring and his sight returned. As a gratitude, he built a monastery and dedicated it to the Presentation of the Blessed Virgin Mary. In time, the monastery was named after him (Bogdan - Bođani).

The church has been demolished and rebuilt several times. The existing church was built in 1722. After the last major reconstruction, a glass plate was installed in front of the altar, so that archaeological remains of the previous churches can be seen.

For a short period in the first half of the 1990s, Bođani became a female monastery.

Characteristics 

The monastery complex consists of the Church of the Presentation of the Blessed Virgin Mary, konaks which surround the church from three sides shaped like a Cyrillic letter "П", a garden and an estate with auxiliary objects.

The church is built in the Baroque style. It is known for its frescoes, the work of Hristofor Žefarović, a translator of the Leonardo da Vinci's A Treatise on Painting in the Greek language, who painted them in the 1730s. Instead of working with the wet plaster, which is one of the main characteristics of the frescoes, Žefarović used the oil paint on dry plaster. The presentation of the Biblical themes is also unusual and differs from the usual ones. He gave his interpretation, which was opposite to the canonical versions, so some consider his work as the spark of the modern Serbian painting. The semicircular supporting pillars are painted with the Book of Genesis motives, while to roof frescoes depict battles between the saints and demons, which have strange, animal-like heads. Saint Margaret the Virgin, in Serbian called Ognjena Marija ("Fiery Mary"), is shown bludgeoning the animal-like, winged and tailed demon with a hammer.

Iconostasis is a superb work of art of its own. It was made in the mid-18th century by an artisan from Kiev.

Bođani Monastery was declared Monument of Culture of Exceptional Importance in 1990, and it is protected by Republic of Serbia.

The monastery garden is popular among the local population and visitors. It has over 150 different plants from all parts of the world, like Egyptian cedar or numerous plants from the Americas. A project of planting the sequoia trees turned unsuccessful due to the climate.

See also 

Monument of Culture of Exceptional Importance
Tourism in Serbia
List of Serb Orthodox monasteries

References

Sources

External links 

Turistička organizacija opštine Bač - Manastir Bođani

15th-century Serbian Orthodox church buildings
Serbian Orthodox monasteries in Vojvodina
Christian monasteries established in the 15th century
Bačka
Bač, Serbia
Cultural Monuments of Exceptional Importance (Serbia)
Buildings and structures completed in 1478
1478 establishments in Europe
15th-century establishments in Serbia